Maihuenia is a genus of cactus (family Cactaceae) and the sole genus of the subfamily Maihuenioideae, which is the smallest subfamily of the Cactaceae. The genus comprises two cushion-forming, mucilaginous species. They are found at high elevation habitats of Andean Argentina and Chile.

Its name is the Latinized version of maihuén, a local Chilean name for these cacti.

Species

References

Cactaceae genera
Cacti of South America
Flora of the Andes
Flora of Argentina
Flora of Chile
Maihuenioideae